Ranoidea macki is a species of frog in the subfamily Pelodryadinae, endemic to West Papua, Indonesia. Its natural habitats are subtropical or tropical moist lowland forests, subtropical or tropical moist montane forests, and rivers.

References
 

Ranoidea (genus)
Amphibians of Western New Guinea
Taxonomy articles created by Polbot
Amphibians described in 2001
Taxobox binomials not recognized by IUCN